This is a list of years in Hungary. See also the timeline of Hungarian history. For only articles about years in Hungary that have been written, see Category:Years in Hungary.

16th century

17th century

18th century

19th century

20th century

21st century

See also
  (1867–1918)

Cities in Hungary
 Timeline of Budapest
 Timeline of Debrecen

Further reading

External links
 

 
Hungary history-related lists
Hungary